In enzymology, a cortisol O-acetyltransferase is an enzyme that catalyzes the chemical reaction

acetyl-CoA + cortisol  CoA + cortisol 21-acetate

Thus, the two substrates of this enzyme are acetyl-CoA and cortisol, whereas its two products are CoA and cortisol 21-acetate.

This enzyme belongs to the family of transferases, specifically those acyltransferases transferring groups other than aminoacyl groups.  The systematic name of this enzyme class is acetyl-CoA:cortisol O-acetyltransferase. Other names in common use include cortisol acetyltransferase, corticosteroid acetyltransferase, and corticosteroid-21-O-acetyltransferase.

References 

 

EC 2.3.1
Enzymes of unknown structure